Pie de la Cuesta Air Force Base (Spanish: Base Aérea Militar No. 7 General de División Gustavo G. León González, Pie de la Cuesta)  is a military airport located in Pie de la Cuesta in the Mexican state of Guerrero.

History 
The airport was inaugurated in 1945 as a civil airport to operate commercial air operations in Acapulco, however the increase in passenger flow exceeded the capacity of the airport, so in 1947 a plan for the construction of a new airport with a greater capacity was executed.

On April 23, 1953, was inaugurated the Acapulco International Airport and Pie de la Cuesta Airport was given to SEDENA to be operated by Mexican Air Force. In 1967 Gustavo Díaz Ordaz named Acapulco Internacional Airpor as Juan N. Álvarez International Airport.

During the Mexican government's state terrorism, the so-called "Dirty War", the base served as a clandestine detention center, where illegal arrests and detentions, torture and interrogations were carried out, as well as the launching of the so-called "death flights", which dropped murdered and dying people from FAM planes into the Pacific Ocean. Among the military personnel accused of operating this method are Mario Arturo Acosta Chaparro, Alfredo Mendiola, Alberto Aguirre and Humberto Rodríguez Acosta. Testimony indicates that teacher and guerrilla member Alicia de los Ríos Merino was last seen alive at this site.

in 1985 it was used to film Rambo II, in which the Pie de la Cuesta Air Force Base pretended to be a Thai Air Force Base.

Facilities and squads 
It has a 7,612-foot-long by 150-foot-wide runway as well a 152,350 sq ft aviation platform with 3 taxiways linked with the runway. It has also 3 hangars, control tower and various military installations.

This military airport is used by 204th Fighter Air Squad, that operates Pilatus PC-7 aircraft. Also is used by 102nd Air Squad, that operates Bell 206 and Bell 212 aircraft.

References

External links 
SEDENA
Bases aéreas de México
Aeródromos de Guerrero

Airports in Guerrero
Mexican Air Force bases